Axel Hansen (cyclist)
 Axel Hansen (footballer)